Voices Deep Within is an album by pianist Cedar Walton which was recorded in 2009 and released on the Highnote label.

Reception
Allmusic reviewed the album stating "Walton always has something beautiful to play that sets him apart from the rest, and is as good as a ton of bullion in his golden, productive years". All About Jazz observed "Since 2001, Cedar Walton's regular excursions into Rudy Van Gelder's legendary Englewood Cliffs studio for the HighNote label have consistently resulted in some of this century's finest mainstream jazz recordings. On Voices Deep Within he continues the tradition, once again demonstrating the vitality and endurance of (t)his music. ".

Track listing 
All compositions by Cedar Walton except as indicated
 "Voices Deep Within" - 6:42
 "Memories of You" (Eubie Blake, Andy Razaf) - 6:07
 "Another Star" (Stevie Wonder) - 8:22
 "Dear Ruth" - 6:16
 "Something in Common" - 6:32
 "Over the Rainbow" (Harold Arlen, Yip Harburg) - 7:03
 "Naima" (John Coltrane) - 6:29
 "No Moe" (Sonny Rollins) - 9:05

Personnel 
Cedar Walton - piano
Vincent Herring - tenor saxophone
Buster Williams - bass
Willie Jones III - drums

Production
Don Sickler - producer
Rudy Van Gelder - engineer

References 

Cedar Walton albums
2009 albums
HighNote Records albums
Albums recorded at Van Gelder Studio